In late February 2005, the dismembered body parts of 19-year-old Rashawn Brazell were found in garbage bags strewn throughout the New York City borough of Brooklyn after he disappeared from his home in the Bushwick neighborhood. He had left in the morning of February 14 to meet his accountant and then meet his mother for lunch in Manhattan. At 7:30 that morning, an unknown person rang the apartment building's security buzzer and Brazell went down to meet him. According to other witnesses, Brazell met a man outside his Brooklyn apartment and the two men entered the subway together at the Gates Avenue station. Witnesses believe the two exited at the Nostrand Avenue station in Bedford–Stuyvesant a short time later. Brazell was never seen alive again.

Discovery of body
On February 18, two bags full of body parts were found on the tracks near the Nostrand Avenue station, and the parts were positively identified through fingerprints as being Rashawn Brazell. An arm and leg, also identified as Brazell's, were found in a recycling plant in Greenpoint, Brooklyn. 

His head was never found. The New York City Police Department searched around the country for clues; America's Most Wanted profiled the case and ran the segment several times.

Investigation and aftermath
A break in the case came in 2017. The police arrested Kwauhuru Govan, Brazell's cousin and former neighbor, who had a criminal history predating 2005; he had since moved to Florida and was imprisoned there in 2014 on an armed robbery conviction. Govan was charged with Brazell's murder. After DNA linked him to another unsolved Brooklyn homicide, he was extradited to New York and charged with the killing of Sharabia Thomas. Govan was convicted of Thomas' murder in 2018. Detectives who asked Govan about the Brazell case claim that he made false and evasive statements. They charged him with the crime on that basis and other evidence, and they suspect he might be a serial killer.

See also
Crime in New York City
List of solved missing person cases
List of unsolved murders

References

External links

2000s missing person cases
2005 in New York City
2005 murders in the United States
Deaths by person in New York City
February 2005 events in the United States
Formerly missing people
Male murder victims
Missing person cases in New York City
Unsolved murders in the United States
History of Brooklyn